Roy Cooper is the 75th and current governor of North Carolina.

Roy Cooper may also refer to:

Roy Percy Cooper (1907–1976), ornithologist
Roy Cooper (rodeo cowboy) (born 1955), American rodeo cowboy
Roy Cooper (West Virginia politician) (born 1945), Republican politician from West Virginia
Roy Cooper, American music executive with Virgin Records, see All for You